Qabala is a city and the administrative centre of the Qabala District of Azerbaijan. The municipality consists of the city of Gabala and the village of Küsnat. Before the city was known as Kutkashen, but after the Republic of Azerbaijan's independence the town was renamed in honour of the much older city of Gabala, the former capital of Caucasian Albania, the archaeological site of which is about 20 km southwest.

History

Antiquity
Gabala is the ancient capital of Caucasian Albania. Archaeological evidence indicates that the city functioned as the capital of Caucasian Albania as early as the 4th century BC.  Up to the present time, there are the ruins of the ancient city and the main gate of Caucasian Albania. Ongoing excavations near the village Chukhur show that Gabala from the 4th – 3rd centuries BC and up to the 18th century was one of the main cities with developed trade and crafts. The ruins of the ancient town are situated 15 km from the regional centre, allocated on the territory between Garachay and Jourluchay rivers. Gabala was located in the middle of the 2,500-year-old Silk Road, and was mentioned by Pliny the Younger as "Kabalaka", Greek geographer Ptolemy as "Khabala", Arabic historian Ahmad ibn Yahya al-Baladhuri as "Khazar". In the 19th century, the Azerbaijani historian Abbasgulu Bakikhanov mentioned in his book  that Kbala or Khabala were in fact Gabala.

In the 60s BC, Roman troops attacked Caucasian Albania but did not succeed in capturing the Qabala territory. In 262 AD, Caucasian Albania was occupied by the Sassanid Empire, but preserved its political and economic status. In 464, it lost its independence due to years of invasions from the northern nomadic tribes and had to move its capital city to Partava (currently Barda in Azerbaijan).

Feudal era
Gabala was occupied by Shirvanshah Fariburz, King David IV of Georgia in 1120, Mongol khan Timurleng in 1386, Safavid shah Tahmasib I in 1538, Persian Nader Shah in 1734 but was able to preserve its culture and identity. After the death of Nader Shah in 1747, the region split into independent khanates and sultanates and Gabala became a Qutqashen Sultanate. It was also called Gabala Mahali. After what is today referred to as The Republic of Azerbaijan was annexed from the Persian Empire, under the Qajar dynasty, by the Russian Empire in 1813 through the consequences of the Russo-Persian War (1804-1813) and the resulting Treaty of Gulistan of 1813, it conducted administrative reforms and in 1841 the khanates of this region were terminated and the territories were incorporated into governorates. Gabala area was added to Nukha uyezd of Elisabethpol Governorate. Due to archaeological finds in Gabala, it was declared a National State Reserve in 1985.

Republic era

After the dissolution of the Soviet Union, Gabala embarked on a process of restructuring on a scale unseen in its history. Thousands of buildings from the Soviet period were demolished to make way for a green belt on its shores; parks and gardens were built on the land reclaimed by filling up the foothill of Gabala. Improvements were made in the general cleaning, maintenance, and garbage collection, and these services are now at Western European standards. The city is growing dynamically and developing at full speed on a north axis along the shores of the Caspian Sea.

As of the 2010s, Gabala is emerging as a magnet for events, such as the summit of Turkic Council in 2013. In 2013, the city was declared the Cultural Capital of the Commonwealth of Independent States, in recognition of its long contribution to the history of Azerbaijan and the region.

Geography
The geographical position and mountainous relief of the city greatly influenced on formation of complex climate conditions in the vertical droughty area, as well as on density of river network and richness of soil-vegetation cover. Relief and humid climate conditions of Gabala region led to formation of a thick river network in the area. The rivers of the city refer to the left branches of Kura basin and run directly into Kura or the rivers of the Shirvan zone.

The city is rich with chestnut and hazelnut trees. Flora and Fauna of the district is rich. Deer and mountain tours, wild boar, hare, bears, wolves, foxes and numerous birds – pheasant, grouse, francolin, etc. can be found in the woods. These features attract hunters.

Economy
The economy of Gabala is partially agricultural, partially tourist based, with some manufacturing industries, mainly for food preserves, tobacco and silkworm cocoon drying. The city's main manufacturing companies are involved in engineering, construction, brewing and distilling and food manufacturing. There is also "Beltmann" piano factory, whose piano-maker is Hans Leferink - the grandson of Johann Beltmann who, in 1901, founded a similar business in the Kingdom of the Netherlands. Various factories operate in the district, such as juice factory and nut factory.

Tourism and shopping 
Qabala is a tourist destination due to the combination of its spring climate, mountainous landscape, and diverse fauna. There are many world-class hotels and resorts, most part of the Qafqaz chain. Natural climatic conditions of the region create opportunities for the development of both summer and winter tourism in the region. The northern side of Qabala belongs to the southern slopes of the Greater Caucasus mountain range, the central part to Alazan-Haftaran valley, the southern part to Ajinohur upland. Furthermore, the highest mountain peak of the republic- Mount Bazarduzu (4466 meters) is situated in this region.

Also located in Qabala is Yeddi Gozel Waterfall. The name means 'seven beauties' due to the seven stages of the falls but also reflecting a classic Nizami Ganjavi story. The waterfall, situated in woodlands west of Vandam, is climbed by thousands of people each year - the lower levels being accessible by stairways.

The city contains "Qabaland" amusement park, an ice skating rink and a Greek-style theatre, rental houses, built especially for outside concerts. Gabala also has several qebelede kiraye evler shopping malls.

Qabala is home to the Tufandag Ski Complex, rated the best ski resort in Azerbaijan and one of the foremost in the Caucasus. The complex serves up to 3,000 people a day.

Culture

Since 2009, city has been home of Gabala International Music Festival, which included performances from classical and jazz performers such as Al Jarreau and the Royal Philharmonic Orchestra.

Gabala also boasts many museums such as Historical Ethnography Museum of Gabala and Gabala Cultural Centre, most notably featuring Folk Theatre named after Jalil Mammadguluzadeh.

Landmarks

Qabala is known for the ruins of an ancient walled city, Chukhur Gabala, dating back to the 4th century BC. The city has a large war memorial, numerous ancient stone houses and the Rashidbek monument, which is shaped like a huge book.

Another landmark is the large Qabala Radar station, on the southern horizon as seen from Gabala, is one of only two Daryal-type missile early warning stations in the former USSR.

Parks and gardens
Qabala has large sections of greenery either preserved by the National Government or designated as green zones. The city includes "Qabaland", which is the largest amusement park in Azerbaijan.

Sports
The city has one professional football team competing in the top-flight of Azerbaijani football – Gabala, currently playing in the Azerbaijan Premier League. The team was managed by former England and Arsenal player Tony Adams in 2010–11 season. The clubs holds its home games in the Gabala City Stadium. The Qabala Horse Racing Complex is used for horse-racing tournaments. As of 2013, there is Qabala Shooting Club functions in the city.

Cuisine 
The district has rich cuisine as other Azerbaijani regions. Popular local dishes include Qabala plov (rice), Dolma with nut, Dovga, Uchgulag, and types of chigirtma (chicken chigirtma, fresh green beans chigirtma,  etc.).

Transport

Public transport
Qabala is linked by regular bus and minibus to Baku, and less frequently to other regional centres. Within the city there are three numbered minibus routes running once or twice an hour.

Air
Qabala Airport is around 20 km south of the city. There are twice weekly flights to Baku and international connections to Dubai and Russia.

Education
There are 4 primary schools, 5 secondary schools and 4 special schools in the town.

Healthcare
Qabala Central Regional Hospital is the largest hospital in the city, Qabala Children's Hospital and Qabala Treatment and Diagnostic Center, which specialises in rehabilitation and long-term illnesses and conditions.

Regional media 
During the USSR period, "Galibiyyat" newspaper was published in Qabala.

Currently, a group of young people created Gabalacity.net website which gives information about Qabala aiming to develop the tourism potential of the district.

Today "Qabala" newspaper is being published in the region which was first published on 15 October 1933 as "Bolshevik Mubarizi". Qabala Region Executive Power manages the publication of "Gabala" newspaper. Nadir Atakishiyev is leading the newspaper.

Climate 
Qabala has a humid continental climate (Dfa) close to the borderline of the humid subtropical climate (Cfa). Climate of Qabala is warm-temperate with dry winters in low areas, cold and damp in high mountains and the annual precipitation is 500–600 mm in the south, and up to 1600 mm in the northern high mountains.

Picture gallery

See also
 Shaki
 Lankaran
 Nakchivan
 Mingachevir

References

External links

Site of Executive Power of Qabala
Introducing Gabala presented by Mark Elliott

Populated places in Qabala District
Capitals of former nations
Elizavetpol Governorate
Caucasian Albania